Leave It to Blondie is a 1945 black-and-white comedy film and the 15th of the 28 Blondie films.

Plot summary

Cast
 Penny Singleton as Blondie
 Arthur Lake as Dagwood
 Larry Simms as Baby Dumpling
Marjorie Ann Mutchie as Cookie
Daisy as Daisy the Dog
 Marjorie Weaver as Rita Rogers
 Jonathan Hale as J.C. Dithers
 Chick Chandler as Eddie Baxter
 Danny Mummert as Alvin Fuddle
 Maude Eburne as Magda
 Eddie Acuff as Mailman

References

External links
 
 
 
 

1945 films
Columbia Pictures films
American black-and-white films
1945 comedy films
Blondie (film series) films
American comedy films
Films directed by Abby Berlin
1940s American films